The Swedish Women's Lobby (formerly Sveriges Kvinnolobby) is a non-partisan political advocacy organization, and an umbrella organization for the Swedish women's rights and women's organizations. It was founded on the initiative of the Government of Sweden in 1997, based on the model of the European Women's Lobby (EWL) on the EU level, and has 40 member organizations. Its president is Susannah Sjöberg. The aim of the organization is "to integrate women's perspectives into all political, economical, and social processes, locally as well as internationally", based on the United Nations Convention on the Elimination of All Forms of Discrimination Against Women and the Beijing Platform for Action. It states that it works "for the rights of all women and girls, including trans women."

The Swedish Women's Lobby is the Swedish coordination of the European Women's Lobby. Eva Fager of the Swedish Women's Lobby serves as vice president of the EWL.

Presidents
Gunvor Ngarambe 1997–2009
Gertrud Åström 2009–2015
Clara Berglund 2015–2016
Anna Giotas Sandquist 2016–2022
Susannah Sjöberg 2022-

See also
Norwegian Women's Lobby

References

External links 
 Swedish Women's Lobby

Feminist organizations in Sweden
Organizations established in 1997
1997 in women's history